Andogyrus is a subgenus of Macrogyrus, a genus of beetles in the family Gyrinidae. It was formerly considered a distinct genus, until a phylogenetic study in 2017 downgraded it in rank to a subgenus. It contains the following species:

 Macrogyrus attenuatus (Ochs, 1954)
 Macrogyrus bos (Brinck, 1977)
 Macrogyrus buqueti (Aubé, 1838)
 Macrogyrus busculus (Brinck, 1977)
 Macrogyrus clypealis (Brinck, 1977)
 Macrogyrus colombicus Régimbart, 1890
 Macrogyrus colombicus brincki Fery & Hájek, 2021 (new name for Andogyrus colombicus australis Brinck, 1977)
 Macrogyrus colombicus colombicus Régimbart, 1890
 Macrogyrus depressus (Brullé, 1838)
 Macrogyrus ellipticus (Brullé, 1838)
 Macrogyrus forsteri (Ochs, 1958)
 Macrogyrus gaujoni (Ochs, 1954)
 Macrogyrus glaucus (Aubé, 1838)
 Macrogyrus lojensis Régimbart, 1892
 Macrogyrus ohausi (Ochs, 1954)
 Macrogyrus peruvianus Régimbart, 1907
 Macrogyrus productus (Brinck, 1977)
 Macrogyrus puncticollis (Ochs, 1954)
 Macrogyrus sedilloti Régimbart, 1883
 Macrogyrus seriatopunctatus Régimbart, 1883
 Macrogyrus viscus (Brinck, 1977)
 Macrogyrus zimmermanni (Ochs, 1954)

References

Gyrinidae
Insect subgenera